John David Newcombe AO OBE (born 23 May 1944) is an Australian former professional tennis player. He is one of the few men to have attained a world No. 1 ranking in both singles and doubles. At the majors, he won seven singles titles, a former record 17 men's doubles titles, and two mixed doubles titles. He also contributed to five Davis Cup titles for Australia during an age when the Davis Cup was deemed as significant as the majors. Tennis magazine rated him the 10th best male player of the period 1965–2005.

Biography
Newcombe played several sports as a boy before devoting himself to tennis. Newcombe's powerful serve and volley was the backbone of his attacking game. He frequently came up with a second-serve ace. He was the Australian junior champion from 1961 to 1963 and was a member of Australia's Davis Cup winning team in 1964. He won his first Grand Slam title in 1965 by taking the Australian Championships doubles title with fellow Australian Tony Roche. That same year, the duo won the Wimbledon doubles title. They teamed to win the Australian doubles championship three more times, Wimbledon another four times and the US Championships in 1967, the French Championships in 1967, and the French Open in 1969. They won 12 Grand Slam titles, which remained the all-time record for a men's doubles team until 2013, when it was surpassed by Bob and Mike Bryan.

Newcombe was the top ranked amateur in the world in 1967 according to Lance Tingay, World Tennis and an Ulrich Kaiser panel of 13 experts and was the first recipient of the Martini and Rossi award after finishing top of their points system in 1967. As a professional, Newcombe was ranked world number one in 1970 by Tingay, World Tennis, Bud Collins, Mike Gibson and Tennis magazine (Germany). He was also ranked world number one in 1971 by Tingay, Rex Bellamy, Collins, Frank Rostron and World Tennis and he and Stan Smith were joint recipients of The 'Martini and Rossi' Award, voted for by 11 journalists. In 1973 Newcombe was ranked world No. 1 by Tingay and Judith Elian. In singles play, he was a two-time winner of the Australian Open, a three-time winner of Wimbledon, and a two-time winner of the US Open.

In January 1968, Newcombe signed a three-year professional contract with Lamar Hunt's World Championship Tennis (WCT) and became part of the "Handsome Eight", the original eight WCT players. Newcome was guaranteed $135,000 annually, which was higher than the best paid baseball player received that year. As a member of the WCT professional tour group and the Players' Union, Newcombe was banned by the International Tennis Federation from competing in the 1972 Wimbledon Championships and he joined the ATP boycott of the event in 1973.

Newcombe was the WCT champion for 1974, defeating Okker, Smith, and Borg in the final.

Newcombe's final major win was the 1975 Australian Open, where he won a series of five set matches against Masters, Roche in the semifinal (saving match points), and Connors in a classic final. The final against Connors may have been his finest performance in tennis.

Newcombe was the last of the Australians who dominated tennis in the 1950s, 60s and 70s.

In his 1979 autobiography, Jack Kramer, the long-time tennis promoter and great player himself, included Newcombe in his list of the 21 greatest players of all time.

Newcombe was captain of the Australian Davis Cup team from 1995 until 2000.

He was inducted into the Sport Australia Hall of Fame in 1985 and in 1986 his achievements were recognized with his induction into the International Tennis Hall of Fame.

Grand Slam finals

Singles: 10 (7 titles, 3 runner-ups)

Grand Slam performance timeline

Singles

Source: ITF

Distinctions
Newcombe served as chairman of the International Tennis Players Association which formed in 1969. 
He served as president of the Association of Tennis Professionals in 1977 and 1978.
Overall, he won 26 Grand Slam titles in singles, doubles, and mixed doubles (27 if his 1965 mixed doubles shared win is added).
Newcombe was appointed Officer of the Order of the British Empire (OBE) in 1978 for services to sport, and Officer of the Order of Australia (AO) in 1989, "for service to the community, particularly to youth and to those with physical disabilities".
Newcombe and Rod Laver are the only players to ever win both the US Open and Wimbledon men's singles titles as an amateur and as a professional. The grass surfaces favoured his game, and the French Open's clay surface was the only major singles championship he never won. However, he did take the French doubles title on three occasions.
He is an Australian Living Treasure.
The Newcombe Medal, awarded yearly to the most outstanding Australian tennis player, is named in honour of his tennis achievements.
He runs the John Newcombe Tennis Ranch & Tennis Academy in New Braunfels, Texas.
In 2001, he was revealed to be President George W. Bush's drinking companion on the night of 4 September 1976, when Bush was charged with driving under the influence. This controversy surfaced during the 2000 US Presidential Election.
He partners with Cliff Drysdale to develop the John Newcombe Estate & Country Club in New Braunfels, Texas.

See also

 List of Grand Slam men's singles champions
 World number one male tennis player rankings
 Tennis male players statistics

References

Bibliography

External links

 
 
 
 
 
 Official Wimbledon website profile
 Enough Rope's John Newcombe interview
 John Newcombe Estate & Country Club
 Sunday Times article 24 January 2010

1944 births
Australian Championships (tennis) champions
Australian Championships (tennis) junior champions
Australian male tennis players
Australian Officers of the Order of the British Empire
Officers of the Order of Australia
Australian Open (tennis) champions
Australian tennis commentators
French Championships (tennis) champions
French Championships junior (tennis) champions
French Open champions
Grand Slam (tennis) champions in boys' singles
Grand Slam (tennis) champions in boys' doubles
Grand Slam (tennis) champions in men's singles
Grand Slam (tennis) champions in men's doubles
Grand Slam (tennis) champions in mixed doubles
International Tennis Hall of Fame inductees
Living people
People educated at Sydney Church of England Grammar School
People from the North Shore, Sydney
Sport Australia Hall of Fame inductees
Sportsmen from New South Wales
Tennis players from Sydney
Sportspeople from New Braunfels, Texas
United States National champions (tennis)
US Open (tennis) champions
Wimbledon champions
Wimbledon champions (pre-Open Era)
ATP number 1 ranked singles tennis players